The Suburban Motor Car Company of Detroit MI specialized in small 2-seater roadsters.  It was powered with a 4-cylinder 20 hp engine for the smaller car.  The 6-cylinder 28 hp engine powered a race car which cost $1200.

References
 

Defunct motor vehicle manufacturers of the United States
Motor vehicle manufacturers based in Michigan
Defunct manufacturing companies based in Michigan